The Grand may refer to:

Buildings

Official names
 The Grand (Calgary), a theatre in Alberta, Canada
The Grand (Ellsworth, Maine), an arts center in Maine, U.S.
 The Grand Doubletree, condominium and hotel skyscraper in Miami, U.S.
 The Grand Cinema, a multiplex in Hong Kong

Colloquial naming

Atlantic Club Casino Hotel, formerly known as Bally's Grand
 Grand Theatre (disambiguation), several cinemas and theatres
 Grand Hotel (disambiguation), several hotels
 Oshkosh Grand Opera House, Oshkosh, Wisconsin, U.S.

Other uses
 The Grand (band), a Norwegian rock group
 The Grand (film), a 2008 comedy film
 The Grand (TV series), a 1990s British TV series, set in a Grand Hotel

See also
 Grand (disambiguation)
The Avenue (Milwaukee), an indoor shopping plaza formerly known as The Grand Avenue